Carl Brynolf Julius Eng (4 July 1910 – 23 March 1988) was a Swedish diplomat. He served as Swedish envoy and ambassador in a number of different countries between 1950 and 1975.

Early life
Eng was born on 4 July 1910 in Roslags-Bro, Norrtälje Municipality, Sweden, the son of director Ruben Eng and his wife Elsa (née Stenström). He passed studentexamen in Stockholm 1929 and received a Candidate of Law degree in 1932 before becoming an attaché at the Ministry for Foreign Affairs in Stockholm in 1933.

Career
Eng served in Berlin in 1935, in Moscow in 1936 and was acting second legation secretary in 1938. He was acting second secretary at the Foreign Ministry in Stockholm in 1939 and first acting secretary in 1940. He was a secretary in various negotiations with the Soviet Union in 1940 and 1941, secretary and representative of trade negotiations with Denmark in 1941 and 1942 and with Finland from 1942 to 1944. Eng was then first legation secretary in Helsinki in 1944 (temporary in 1942). He served in Warsaw in 1945 where he was the Swedish government's delegate at the Provisional Government of National Unity in 1945. Eng was given the title legation counselor the same year and then served as acting consul in Danzig in 1945. Eng was the first legation secretary in Warsaw in 1946 and he was chairman and representative of negotiations with Poland from 1945 to 1947.

Eng was acting legation counselor in 1946 and legation counselor in 1947 as well as chairman of the Swedish-Polish Technical Committee in 1947 and chairman of railway negotiations with the Soviet occupation zone of Germany from 1947 to 1949. He served at the Swedish Legation in Berlin in 1947 and was legation counselor and consul in 1947, and had the consul general's position in 1948. Eng was representative of trade and payment negotiations with Germany from 1948 to 1949. He was then envoy in Bogotá as well as non-resident envoy in Panama City in 1950 and in Quito from 1951. Eng was envoy in Cairo and non-resident in Beirut and Damascus in 1955. In 1957, Eng became ambassador in Cairo and non-resident ambassador in Riyadh. Also in 1957, the Canadian ambassador in Cairo, E. Herbert Norman committed suicide by jumping of Eng's apartment building. Two years later, Eng was ambassador in Cairo and envoy in Riyadh. He was ambassador in The Hague from 1961 to 1965 and in Rome from 1966 to 1973, as well as non-resident ambassador in Valletta from 1969 to 1973. Eng's last position before retirement was as ambassador in Moscow and non-resident ambassador in Ulaanbaatar from 1973 to 1975.

Eng was chairman of the Italy Department of the Svenska Rominstitutets vänners ("Friends of the Swedish Institute in Rome") and of the Special Committee on Management Staff/Relations of the Food and Agriculture Organization (FAO). He was vice chairman of the FAO Appeals Committee, honorary member of the Swedish Chamber of Commerce in The Hague and the Swedish School Association in Rome. Eng wrote a number of journal articles in legal subjects and papers in economic press, Il Mezzogiorno (account of developments in southern Italy) and a large number of anthologies in Italian relating to Swedish-Italian relations and contacts.

Personal life
In 1938, Eng married Baroness Wanda Gyllenstierna (born 1917), the daughter of Baron Eric Gyllenstierna and Wanda Henriksson. They divorced and he married Annelise Pedersen (born 1916), the daughter of Aage Pedersen and Anna Lottenburger. He was the father of Peter (born 1946), Camilla (born 1948) and Monica (born 1950).

Awards and decorations
Eng's awards:

Commander of the Order of the Polar Star
Grand Cross of the Order of San Carlos
Grand Cross of the Ecuadorian Merit Badge Al Mérito
Grand Cross of the National Order of the Cedar
Grand Cross of the Order of Vasco Núñez de Balboa
Grand officer of the Colombian ? (StOffColMerIndO)
Grand Officer of the Order of Civil Merit
Commander of the Order of the Crown of Italy
Officer of the Order of Orange-Nassau
Knight of the Order of the Dannebrog
Knight First Class of the Order of the White Rose of Finland
Knight First Class of the Order of St. Olav
First Class of the Cross of Merit
Grand Cross of the Order of the Republic

Bibliography

References

1910 births
1988 deaths
Ambassadors of Sweden to Colombia
Ambassadors of Sweden to Panama
Ambassadors of Sweden to Ecuador
Ambassadors of Sweden to Egypt
Ambassadors of Sweden to Lebanon
Ambassadors of Sweden to Syria
Ambassadors of Sweden to Saudi Arabia
Ambassadors of Sweden to the Netherlands
Ambassadors of Sweden to Italy
Ambassadors of Sweden to Malta
Ambassadors of Sweden to the Soviet Union
Ambassadors of Sweden to Mongolia
People from Norrtälje Municipality
Commanders of the Order of the Polar Star